The Jungle Bunch is a 2017 French 3D computer-animated superhero comedy film directed by David Alaux. Based on the animated series The Jungle Bunch, the film was released in Italy on 27 September 2017 and was poorly received in the UK but was a box office success overall, with over a million admissions.

Plot 
An iceberg with an egg appears on the banks of the Jungle. Meanwhile, The Champs, consisting of the big guerror bengal tigress Natacha, an hippie three-toed sloth named Tony, a neurotic javan rhinoceros named  Goliath and the crested porcupine Ricky, are engaged in saving all the inhabitants the Jungle, mainly due to the evil deeds of an koala named Igor. During the next chase, Igor almost manages to escape from the island in a small boat, but he collides with the iceberg, preventing the koala from leaving the shore. Igor tries to break the egg (delivered by the iceberg), but is defeated by The Champs.

As Natacha sends to Igor to the Island of the Lost, a small desert island where evil animals are exiled, he tells her that he left in the Jungle exploding mushrooms, which are already starting to explode at that moment. Natacha immediately hurries back to shore to save the rest of the inhabitants. During the ensuing fire in the Jungle, Ricky, for the sake of saving the rest, sacrifices himself, while throwing the egg to safety. Natacha believes that the activities of The Champs led to the death of Ricky, and together with Goliath and Tony abolishes the team. Goliath, who considered himself unnecessary after the collapse of the team, leaves. Soon, a baby penguin hatches from the egg Ricky threw, whom Natacha calls Maurice and raises as her son. When Maurice grows up, he feels the desire to follow in the footsteps of his mother, against her will, and save all inhabitants of those who are in danger from other evil animals. Maurice says goodbye to his mother, and sets out on his journey. In parallel scenes of Maurice growing, Igor has the seed of a tree with him, and nurtures its growth, and at the same time acquiring a lieutenant – Surimi the coconut crab.

Years later, the Jungle Bunch is busy rescuing elephants who were forced to serve the olive baboons under their threat to destroy the sacred totem. The team successfully coped with this mission. In the meantime, Igor finally waited for the tree to grow, and he, along with Surimi, leave the Island of the Lost. Soon, the Jungle Bunch notice a burning tree and they arrive there, where they meet Igor, who lures them into a trap and learns from them that Maurice is Natacha's son. Igor talks about his plans to destroy them, and then The Champs, and then he leaves, leaving the Jungle Bunch to wait for them to die from the explosion of his mushrooms. The team manage to escape from the explosion due to Miguel's powerful allergy to ficus flowers, after which they head to Natacha. Igor takes the baboons under his army, who because of the Jungle Bunch can not engage in banditry. Igor develops the idea of undermining the cave, so that the Jungle will collapse and be flooded. When the Jungle Bunch arrive at Natacha's home, she is pleased to meet her son Maurice and his grandson Junior, but soon learns from Maurice about the return of Igor and tells his son the story about the koala. Igor had wanted to join The Champs as their leader, but the others thought that he was no. Natacha decides to find Goliath with Tony and revive The Champs, while not wanting to involve Maurice and his Jungle Bunch in their affairs.

The next day, The Champs decide to interfere with Igor's plans, while cutting off the road to the Jungle Bunch, destroying the bridge. When The Champs find Igor, he, in turn, leads them into his trap, but the team almost managed to defeat Igor. Maurice decided to help The Champs by catapulting himself and his son, but his intervention led to Igor escaping, and he takes Junior with him as a hostage. Natacha shows Maurice that, through his fault, Igor escaped and kidnapped his son, and asks the "Jungle Bunch" not to intervene. Maurice himself gets disappointed and removes himself from his own team. As a storm began to rage, Maurice's stripes are gradually washed off. The Champs reach Igor's lair, but are ambushed and captured by Igor. Maurice soon finds himself near the pond and sees the memories where he left his home and found an egg, from which a small fish hatched and he sheltered him, making him his son. At that time, Junior escapes from captivity and arrives at the pond where Maurice is still. Maurice is glad of the return of his son and finds out that The Champs are in captivity and many animals are enslaved, forced to grow mushroom-bombs for Igor. Maurice restores yellow stripes on his body and makes a new aquarium for Junior, since his son's main aquarium was still in Igor's lair.

Maurice and Junior return to the Jungle Bunch, which they wanted to save The Champs without Maurice's help, and with them, they penetrate inside the lair of Igor under the disguise of two baboons with fruit & vegetables. The heroes release The Champs and together they fight the baboons. During then, Beatrice finally confesses her love for Gilbert, to whom the latter accepts & decides to keep it between them, unaware they've confessed it to everyone, after Batrica pulled Igor's microphone flap to save Gilbert. Shortly after the defeat of the baboons, Igor activates the bombs and disappears. Maurice instructs The Champs to evacuate the inhabitants of the jungle, and he and the Jungle Bunch go to prevent the mushrooms from exploding. After riding a minecart down to the main mushroom bomb, Gilbert suggests that they should knock down some bombs, in order to stop the giant mushroom bomb. Maurice succeeds, but he nearly relights the bombs when his belt lights on fire. Fortunately, Junior hops out of his aquarium and extinguishes the fire.

Having managed to save the jungle, The Champs and the Jungle Bunch again face Igor, who declares that he will never stop, but Maurice catapults Junior, who in turn drives away Surimi from the jetpack, who takes off in a parachute, then overloads the ammunition, causing Igor's jetpack to malfunction. Soon, The Champs decide to retire, while the Jungle Bunch continue their heroism.

Later in the post-credits scene it has revealed that Igor is still alive & he & Surimi are back on the Island Of The Lost. After the final credits, Igor finds another seed on the island, but this time a seagull seizes it, meaning that he is stuck on the island forever and for good.

Cast

French Dub
 Philippe Bozo as Maurice the Emperor penguin
  as Gilbert the tarsier
  as Miguel the gorilla
 Céline Monsarrat as Batricia the fruitbat
 Emmanuel Curtil as Al the glass frog
  as Bob the cane toad
  as Natasha the Bengal tiger
 Frantz Confiac as Tony the Three-toed sloth
 Alain Dorval as Goliath the Javan rhinoceros
 Richard Darbois as Igor the koala

English Dub
Kirk Thornton as Maurice
Kaiji Tang as Junior, Tony
Cam Stance as Miguel
André Gordon as Gilbert, Al
Christopher Corey Smith as Bob
Erin Fitzgerald as Batricia
Dorothy Fahn as Natasha
Richard Epcar as Goliath
Keith Silverstein as Igor

Release 
The film was released in France on 26 July 2017. In the UK and US, it was released on 15 September 2017. It was released in Australia on 25 January 2018.

Sequel
A sequel to The Jungle Bunch is scheduled for release in 2023, with Benoît Somville to direct and David Alaux, Éric Tosti, and Jean-François Tosti returning to write the film.

Critical response 
In the US, the film was a failure among critics. The site's critical consensus reads, "At once restless and plodding, The Jungle Bunch is a woefully indistinct piece of animated kiddie fare." On Metacritic, the film received an score of 38 out of 100 based on 4 reviews.

References

External links

 

2017 films
2017 3D films
2017 comedy films
2017 computer-animated films
2010s French animated films
2010s children's comedy films
2010s children's animated films
2010s superhero comedy films
2010s English-language films
2010s French-language films
French 3D films
French computer-animated films
French children's comedy films
French superhero films
Animated superhero comedy films
3D animated films
English-language French films
Animated films based on animated television series
Animated films about penguins
Animated films about fish
Animated films about gorillas
Animated films about frogs
Animated films about amphibians
Films about bats
Films about rhinoceroses
Fictional sloths and anteaters
Animated films about koalas
Films about tigers
Talking animals in fiction
Films set in Africa
Films set in jungles
Animated films set on islands